Mustafizur Rahman Chowdhury Emon (known as Emon Chowdhury) is a Bangladeshi musician best known as working outside of the rock band Chirkutt. He won Bangladesh National Film Award for Best Music Director for his work in the film Maya: The Lost Mother.

Background
Emon Chowdhury's father Matiur Rahman Chowdhury was the principal of Nazrul Academy in Narshingdi.

References

Living people
Bangladeshi male musicians
Bangladeshi guitarists
Best Music Director National Film Award (Bangladesh) winners
Place of birth missing (living people)
1990 births